Northwest Harwinton is a census-designated place (CDP) in the town of Harwinton in Litchfield County, Connecticut, United States. The population was 3,158 at the 2020 census, out of 5,484 in the entire town. The CDP contains the town center.

Geography
The CDP occupies the northwestern quarter of the town of Harwinton, bordered to the north by the town of New Hartford, to the northwest by the city of Torrington, and to the west by the town of Litchfield. The southern edge of the CDP follows Connecticut Route 118 (Litchfield Road) west of Route 222 (Hill Road), and Delay Road, Swimming Hole Road, and Shingle Mill Road east of Route 222. The eastern edge of the CDP follows Plymouth Road, Harmony Hill Road, and North Road. The CDP includes the Harwinton town center at the intersection of Routes 118 and 4, as well as the residential community surrounding Lake Harwinton.

Route 4 leads east  to West Hartford and northwest  to Torrington, while Route 118 leads west  to Litchfield borough, and Route 222 leads south  to Thomaston.

The Naugatuck River forms the western edge of the CDP and the town of Harwinton.

Demographics
As of the census of 2010, there were 3,252 people, 1,307 households, and 980 families residing in the CDP. There were 1,386 housing units, of which 79, or 5.7%, were vacant. The racial makeup of the CDP was 97.4% White, 0.3% African American, 0.1% Native American, 1.0% Asian, 0.1% Native Hawaiian or Pacific Islander, 0.2% some other race, and 1.0% from two or more races. Hispanic or Latino of any race were 1.6% of the population.

Of the 1,307 households in the community, 32.4% had children under the age of 18 living with them, 61.4% were headed by married couples living together, 8.9% had a female householder with no husband present, and 25.0% were non-families. 21.7% of all households were made up of individuals, and 10.3% were someone living alone who was 65 years of age or older. The average household size was 2.48, and the average family size was 2.87.

22.4% of the CDP population were under the age of 18, 5.7% were from 18 to 24, 20.7% were from 25 to 44, 33.4% were from 45 to 64, and 17.9% were 65 years of age or older. The median age was 45.8 years. For every 100 females, there were 99.9 males. For every 100 females age 18 and over, there were 96.0 males.

For the period 2013–17, the estimated median income for a household in the CDP was $100,863, and the median income for a family was $110,357. The per capita income for the CDP was $41,424. Male full-time workers had a median income of $72,321 compared with $46,563 for females. 3.8% of families and 7.4% of the total population were living below the poverty line, including 18.5% of people under 18 and 5.7% of those over 64.

References

Census-designated places in Litchfield County, Connecticut
Harwinton, Connecticut
Census-designated places in Connecticut